Zhanran (711-782), sometimes called Miao-lo (or Miaole) was the sixth patriarch of the  Tiantai school of Chinese Buddhism and helped to revive the school's proéminence after a period of decline. His lay surname was Qi 戚 and he was also known as Jingqi 荊溪 after his birthplace (in modern-day Yixing 宜興 county, Jiangsu province). Early in his monastic training, traditional biographies stated that he thoroughly studied the Vinaya in Four Parts before being ordained by precepts master T'an-i (曇一, 692-771).

As head of the Tiantai order, Zhanran spent much time and energy writing commentaries on the works of Zhiyi, and writing defenses of the Tiantai school against the newer Faxiang and Huayan schools.  Zhanran is best known for his scriptural exegesis of such works as Zhiyi's Mohe Zhiguan (The Great Calming and Contemplation), as well as his promotion of the doctrine of universal Buddha-nature. He is the author of The Adamantine Scalpel (金剛錍 Jin'gang Pi) among other works.

References

Bibliography
 
 Chen, Shuman (2011). Chinese Tiantai Doctrine on Insentient Things’ Buddha-Nature, Chung-Hwa Buddhist Journal 24, 71-104
 Pap, Melinda (2011). Demonstration of the Buddha-nature of the Insentient in Zhanran's The Diamond Scalpel Treatise. Doctoral Dissertation, Budapest: Eötvös Loránd University
 Tseng, Chih-Mien, Adrian (2014). A Comparison of the Concepts of Buddha-Nature and Dao-Nature in Medieval China, PhD Thesis, Hamilton, Ontario: McMaster University

External links
 Short biography in Chinese
 Digital Dictionary of Buddhism  (log in with userID "guest")

Tiantai Buddhists
711 births
782 deaths